Mere Papa Hero Hiralal is an Indian television series starring Sarwar Ahuja and Riva Arora. It is produced by Viniyard Films and premiered on 12 February 2018, on Discovery Jeet. The show is also available on Netflix.

The show is based on the real-life story of a rickshaw driver. The project is headed by Santosh Shendye and Payal Chandan while Mohammad Faizan is the creative Producer of the show.

The episodes have been written by Saurabh Jain and Saheb while the creative Director of the show is Dhananjay Mulay.

Cast
Sarwar Ahuja as Hiralal Tiwari
Riva Arora as Gungun
Ashima Bhalla as Inspector Mina

References 

Discovery Jeet original programming
2018 Indian television series debuts
2018 Indian television series endings
Indian drama television series
Television shows set in Uttar Pradesh